DXRL (DXJV 102.1 MHz) is an FM station owned and operated by Capitol Broadcasting Center. Its studios and transmitter are located at Brgy. Maloloy-on, Molave, Zamboanga del Sur.

References

External links
DYRL-DXRL FB Page

Radio stations in Zamboanga del Sur
Radio stations established in 2016